Quattro Giornate is a station on line 1 of the Naples Metro. It was opened on 5 April 2001 as part of the section the line between Vanvitelli and Museo. The station is located between Vanvitelli and Salvator Rosa.

References

Naples Metro stations
Railway stations opened in 2001
2001 establishments in Italy
Railway stations in Italy opened in the 21st century